The 2001 Scottish Cup Final was played on 26 May 2001 at Hampden Park in Glasgow and was the final of the 116th Scottish Cup competition. Celtic and Hibernian contested the match, which Celtic won 3–0, completing the third domestic treble in the club's history. Jackie McNamara opened the scoring in the first half running onto a through ball to angle the ball past Hibernian goalkeeper Nick Colgan. In the second half Henrik Larsson scored twice, with a penalty and a hard shot into the top corner.

Match details

External links
Match Reports

2001
Scottish Cup Final 2001
Scottish Cup Final 2001
Cup Final
2000s in Glasgow